Wensheng District is a district of the city of Liaoyang, Liaoning province, People's Republic of China.

Administrative divisions
There are six subdistricts within the district.

Subdistricts:
Wensheng Subdistrict, Wusheng Subdistrict, Xiangping Subdistrict, Nanmen Subdistrict, Dongxing Subdistrict, Qingyang Subdistrict

References

External links

County-level divisions of Liaoning
Liaoyang